Danilo Grassi (born 1 January 1941) is an Italian racing cyclist. He won stage 14 of the 1965 Giro d'Italia.

Major results
1962
1st  World Team Time Trial Championships (with Mario Maino, Dino Zandegù and Antonio Tagliani)
1963
1st  National Team Time Trial Championships (with Mario Maino, Dino Zandegù and Fabrizio Fabbri)
1st Time trial, Mediterranean Games (with Mario Maino, Dino Zandegù and Fabrizio Fabbri)
2nd World Team Time Trial Championships
1965
1st Stage 14 Giro d'Italia

References

External links
 

1941 births
Living people
Italian male cyclists
Italian Giro d'Italia stage winners
Cyclists from the Province of Varese
Competitors at the 1963 Mediterranean Games
Mediterranean Games competitors for Italy